Holly Kearl is an author who has written three books on street harassment and four national studies on sexual harassment issues. She is the founder of the NGO Stop Street Harassment. 

She's also worked for entities like AAUW, UN Women, OpEd Project and the Aspen Institute on programs focused on gender equity and elevating under-represented voices. She received a bachelor's degree from Santa Clara University and a master's degree from George Washington University.

References

https://hollykearl.com/

Living people
Santa Clara University alumni
George Washington University alumni
American women writers
Year of birth missing (living people)